Attack Squadron 210 (VA-210) was an aviation unit of the United States Naval Reserve active between 1970 and 1971. VA-210 aircraft wore CVWR-20's tail code "AF", the squadron's nickname was Black Hawks.

History
The United States Navy reorganized its Naval Air Reserve units in 1970. To bolster their strength two Reserve Carrier Air Wings (CVWR) were formed, CVWR-20 on the U.S. East Coast and CVWR-30 on the U.S. West Coast.

Utilizing assets from reserve squadron VA-2Z1 attack squadron VA-210 was established at the NAS South Weymouth, Massachusetts on 1 July 1970. The unit was commanded by Commander W.M. Hollister and equipped with A-4C Skyhawk attack planes.

However, CVWR-20 had originally only attack squadrons. The decision was made to replace two of the attack squadrons by fighter squadrons in 1971. VA-210 was one of the squadrons to be replaced by fighter squadrons VF-201 and VF-202. Aircraft of VA-201 made their last operational flight on 14 December 1970, the squadron being disestablished on 30 June 1971.

See also
 List of squadrons in the Dictionary of American Naval Aviation Squadrons
History of the United States Navy
List of inactive United States Navy aircraft squadrons
List of United States Navy aircraft squadrons

References

External links
VA-210 history on skyhawk.org

Attack squadrons of the United States Navy